This is a list of notable writers from Bulgaria:

Fiction and non-fiction authors

Elena Alexieva
Emil Andreev
Boris Aprilov
Milan Asadurov
Ivan Bogorov
Hristo Botev
Hristo Boychev
Voydan Chernodrinski
Chudomir
Constantine of Kostenets
Constantine of Preslav
Presbyter Cosmas
Lyuben Dilov
Ilko Dimitrov
Kristin Dimitrova
Dimitar Dimov
Sava Dobroplodni
Anton Donchev
Vasil Drumev
Yordan Eftimov
Deyan Enev
Zdravka Evtimova
John Exarch
Valentin Fortunov
Lada Galina
Mihalaki Georgiev
Nayden Gerov
Nikola Gigov
Georgi Gospodinov
Andrey Gulyashki
Nikolay Haytov
Chernorizets Hrabar
Nikolai Hristozov
Kiril Hristov
Rangel Ignatov
Kalin Iliev
Dimitar Inkyov
Angel Karaliychev
Georgi Karaslavov
Hristo Karastoyanov
Stefan Kisyov
Aleko Konstantinov
Ventseslav Konstantinov
Krastyo Krastev
Lora Lazar
Vladimir Lukov
Georgi Markov
Agop Melkonyan
Stoyan Mihaylovski
Svetoslav Minkov
Aleksandra Monedzhikova
Vera Mutafchieva
Chavdar Mutafov
Galin Nikiforov
Paisius of Hilendar
Viktor Paskov
Konstantin Pavlov
Elin Pelin
Valeri Petrov
Alek Popov
Fani Popova-Mutafova
Naum Preslavski
Khristo Poshtakov
Yordan Radichkov
Radoy Ralin
Tsoncho Rodev
Milen Ruskov
Sevda Sevan
Ivo Siromahov
Svetoslav Slavchev
Sophronius of Vratsa
Georgi Stamatov
Albena Stambolova
Emiliyan Stanev
Petar Stapov
Lyudmil Stoyanov
Anton Strashimirov
Stanislav Stratiev
Dimitar Talev
Georgi Tenev
Petko Todorov
Stefan Tsanev
Pavel Tsvetkov
Ivan Vazov
Ilya Velchev
Konstantin Velichkov
Emanuil A. Vidinski
Vladislav the Grammarian
Angel Wagenstein
Yana Yazova
Nedyalko Yordanov
Stoyan Zagorchinov
Stoyan Zaimov

See also
List of Bulgarian women writers

 
Writers
Bulgarian